Myolepta nigra  (Loew, 1872), the Black Pegleg , is an uncommon species of syrphid fly observed in the eastern and central United States and Eastern Canada. Hoverflies can remain nearly motionless in flight. The adults are also known as flower flies for they are commonly found on flowers from which they get both energy-giving nectar and protein-rich pollen. The larvae of this genus are found in the rotholes of deciduous trees.

References

Eristalinae
Articles created by Qbugbot
Insects described in 1972
Taxa named by Hermann Loew